Im Hyung-joon (born May 10, 1974) is a South Korean actor.

Personal life
On January 2, 2012, Im married his non-celebrity girlfriend, who is ten years younger than him, at Gimpo Mayfield Hotel. They gave birth to the first child, a son, on August 24, 2012.

Filmography

Film

Television series

Web series

Television show

Musical/Theater

Awards and nominations

References

External links

Im Hyung-joon at Daum 
Im Hyung-joon at Naver Movies 

IHQ (company) artists
South Korean male film actors
South Korean male television actors
South Korean male stage actors
South Korean television personalities
Male actors from Seoul
1974 births
Living people
People from Seoul
Seoul Institute of the Arts alumni
20th-century South Korean male actors
21st-century South Korean male actors